Lieutenant General Thomas Bligh (1685–1775) was an Irish-born British soldier, best known for his service during the Seven Years' War when he led a series of amphibious raids, known as "descents" on the French coastline. Despite initial success in these operations, they came to an end following the disastrous Battle of St Cast.

Career
Bligh was born in 1685, the son of Irish politician, Thomas Bligh and his wife Elizabeth née Napier. During his long service in the British army, he rose to the rank of Lieutenant General. In 1745, during the War of the Austrian Succession, as a Brigadier, he took over command of allied troops at the battle of Melle and led part of the defeated force to safety. He fought at Dettingen, Val, Fontneay, and Melle.  He was also commander of the British troops at Cherbourg. In 1758 he was appointed to command the descents, at the age of seventy-three. He led an initial successful Raid on Cherbourg in August September 1758, capturing and destroying the town's fortifications. He then re-embarked and moved along the coast to St Malo. There, confronted with adverse weather conditions, they were able only to land some of their force, which was soon confronted by a larger French force with had hurriedly marched there from Brest. In the scramble to get his men back onto the ships, Bligh fought a confused rearguard action, the Battle of Saint Cast suffering between 750–1000 casualties before he was finally able to re-embark his men. They then sailed for England.

Bligh was poorly treated when he returned home. King George II refused to receive him, considered an enormous slight, and he came under fierce criticism from all sides. One of the few to stand up for Bligh was the young Prince of Wales, later George III, who chastised both the Prime Minister Duke of Newcastle and his ally William Pitt for not defending Bligh.

He was buried at Rathmore Church, Ireland.

See also
 Great Britain in the Seven Years War

References

 Peerage of England

Bibliography
 Anderson, Fred. Crucible of War: The Seven Years' War and the Fate of Empire in British North America, 1754–1766. Faber and Faber, 2001

External links
Met picture
 Thomas Bligh (1685–1775) in the Oxford Dictionary of National Biography: 

British Army lieutenant generals
1685 births
1775 deaths
Thomas
People from County Meath
Irish officers in the British Army
Lancashire Fusiliers officers
5th Dragoon Guards officers
12th Royal Lancers officers
British Army personnel of the Seven Years' War